Scott Davis and David Pate were the defending champions, but Pate did not participate this year.  Davis partnered Brad Gilbert, losing in the quarterfinals.

Sergio Casal and Emilio Sánchez won the title, defeating Christo Steyn and Danie Visser 3–6, 6–1, 7–6 in the final.

Seeds
All seeds receive a bye into the second round.

Draw

Finals

Top half

Bottom half

References
Draw

U.S. Pro Indoor
1987 Grand Prix (tennis)